Benton County is a county in the East Central part of the U.S. state of Minnesota. As of the 2020 census, the population was 41,379. Its county seat is Foley.

Benton County is part of the St. Cloud Metropolitan Statistical Area, which is also included in the Minneapolis-St. Paul Combined Statistical Area.

History
Established in 1849 and organized in 1850, the county is one of the oldest in Minnesota. It was named for Thomas Hart Benton, a United States Senator from Missouri. Its county seat for many years was Sauk Rapids, at the confluence of the Sauk and Mississippi Rivers. The county seat moved to Watab in 1856 and returned to Sauk Rapids in 1859. Sauk Rapids became the terminus of a railroad line in 1874, but was destroyed by a tornado in 1886. In 1897 the county seat moved to Foley, where it remains. As St. Cloud expanded into a metropolitan area, the northern part of Benton County became a suburb.

Geography
The Mississippi River flows southeast along Benton County's western border, and the Platte River flows south through the county's northwest corner, discharging into the Mississippi at the county's western border. The terrain consists of low rolling hills, wooded or devoted to agriculture. It generally slopes to the south and east, although its western portion slopes into the river valleys. It is the fifth-smallest county in Minnesota by land area and fourth-smallest by total area.

Major highways

  U.S. Highway 10
  Minnesota State Highway 15
  Minnesota State Highway 23
  Minnesota State Highway 25
  Minnesota State Highway 95

Adjacent counties

 Mille Lacs - east
 Sherburne - south
 Stearns - west
 Morrison - north

Lakes

 Donovan Lake (part)
 Graham Lake
 Little Rock Lake
 Mayhew Lake

Protected areas

 Benlacs State Wildlife Management Area (part)
 Bibles State Wildlife Management Area
 Englund Ecotone Scientific and Natural Area
 Sartell State Wildlife Management Area
 Wisneski State Wildlife Management Area

Climate and weather

Demographics

As of the 2000 census, there were 34,226 people, 13,065 households, and 8,518 families in the county. The population density was 83.9/sqmi (32.4/km2). There were 13,460 housing units at an average density of 33/sqmi (12.7/km2). The racial makeup of the county was 96.22% White, 0.78% Black or African American, 0.52% Native American, 1.15% Asian, 0.05% Pacific Islander, 0.35% from other races, and 0.94% from two or more races. 0.90% of the population were Hispanic or Latino of any race. 47.8% were of German, 12.1% Polish and 8.8% Norwegian ancestry.

There were 13,065 households, out of which 35.30% had children under the age of 18 living with them, 52.10% were married couples living together, 8.80% had a female householder with no husband present, and 34.80% were non-families. 25.80% of all households were made up of individuals, and 8.90% had someone living alone who was 65 years of age or older. The average household size was 2.56 and the average family size was 3.14.

The county population contained 27.10% under the age of 18, 12.20% from 18 to 24, 31.00% from 25 to 44, 18.70% from 45 to 64, and 11.00% who were 65 years of age or older. The median age was 32 years. For every 100 females, there were 99.60 males. For every 100 females age 18 and over, there were 96.30 males.

The median income for a household in the county was $41,968, and the median income for a family was $51,277. Males had a median income of $33,214 versus $22,737 for females. The per capita income for the county was $19,008. About 4.50% of families and 7.10% of the population were below the poverty line, including 6.30% of those under age 18 and 12.60% of those age 65 or over.

2020 census

Communities

Cities

 Foley (county seat)
 Gilman
 Rice
 Royalton (partial)
 St. Cloud (partial)
 Sartell (partial)
 Sauk Rapids

Townships

 Alberta
 Gilmanton
 Glendorado
 Graham
 Granite Ledge
 Langola
 Mayhew Lake
 Maywood
 Minden
 Saint George
 Sauk Rapids
 Watab

Census-designated place
 Ronneby

Unincorporated communities

 Brennyville
 Duelm
 Fruitville
 Glendorado
 Granite Ledge
 Jakeville
 Mayhew
 North Benton
 Oak Park
 Parent
 Popple Creek
 Rum River
 Silver Corners
 Watab

Ghost towns
 Estes Brook
 Minden

Government and politics
Benton County voters have tended to vote Republican for the past few decades. In 2016 Donald Trump won the county with 64.2%, the highest share of the vote for any presidential candidate since Franklin D. Roosevelt in 1932.

See also
 Great River Regional Library
 National Register of Historic Places listings in Benton County, Minnesota

References

External links
 Benton County Government’s website
 Minnesota Department of Transportation's official highway map of Benton County
 Benton County Fair
 Benton County Historical Society and Museum (in Sauk Rapids)
 Sartell Historical Society
 MNGenUSGen Web Site for Benton County, Minnesota - genealogy
 Sauk Rapids and Benton County - Images of America Series - approximately 200 vintage photographs
 Benton County Map

 
Minnesota counties
St. Cloud, Minnesota metropolitan area
Minnesota counties on the Mississippi River
1850 establishments in Minnesota Territory
Populated places established in 1850